Optima bank, is a banking and financial services institution in Greece, which apart from its full banking license, is also a member of the Athens Stock Exchange. It offers its customers, both retail and businesses, products and services according to their needs.

Optima bank HQ's are located in Maroussi of Athens (Aigialeias 32 and Paradissou street).

History 
Optima bank was created on 31 July 2019, following Ireon Investments Ltd announcement of the acquisition of Investment Bank of Greece by CPB. Ireon Investments Ltd is a wholly owned subsidiary of Motor Oil Hellas SA.

 On 2.10.2019 Investment Bank of Greece was renamed Optima bank.
 On 24.10.2019, Optima bank opened the first Optima bank branch in Psychiko.
 On 12.11.2020 Optima bank acquired 94.5% of Optima asset management AEDAK from Ireon Investments, increasing its holding to 99.4%.
 On 11.12.2020 Optima bank acquired 100% of Optima factors from Ireon Investments, a subsidiary of the Motor Oil Group.
 In January 2021 Optima bank completed the share capital increase 80 million euros.
 In December 2021 Optima bank completed the first profitable financial year.
 In October 2022 Optima bank completed  a 60 million euro convertible bond loan issue.

Today, Optima bank maintains a multi-stakeholder character, having doubled its capital base, following the capital increase implemented in January 2021.

References

Bibliography
IBOGGRAAXXX, published by TransferWise, "Optima bank..."

External links

Banks of Greece
Greek brands
Banks established in 2000
Greek companies established in 2000